Francesco Colonnese (born 10 August 1971) is an Italian former professional footballer who played as a full-back.

Club career
Born in Potenza, Colonnese began his career in Potenza - where he played from 1989 to 1991 – before moving first to Giarre Football and then to Cremonese, where he made 66 appearances.

In the 1994–95 season, Colonnese was bought by A.S. Roma to strengthen the defensive department, but disappointed the expectations of manager Carlo Mazzone and played only 5 games.

In 1995, he signed for Napoli on loan – spending two years there – and played for F.C. Internazionale during the 1997–98 season, with whom he won the UEFA Cup over S.S. Lazio in Paris in 1998.

From 2000 to 2004 he signed for Roman club Lazio – then the reigning Serie A champions. After four years at the Olimpico he left to finish his career with Siena (2004–2006).

International career
Francesco Colonnese was capped for Italy national under-21 football team between 1993 and 1994. He finished in fourth place with the Italian U-23 Olympic side at the 1993 Mediterranean Games men's football tournament.

Style of play
A physically strong and tenacious defender, Colonnese was known for his man-marking ability, and was capable of playing both as a right-sided full-back and as a central defender, or even as a sweeper. Throughout his career, he was given the nickname Ciccio Colonna, a reference to the Italian diminutive of his name, as well as his physical, hard-tackling playing style and tough marking of his opponents. He was also known for his ability to mark fast players.

Honours
Inter
UEFA Cup: 1997–98

Lazio
Supercoppa Italiana: 2000
Coppa Italia: 2003–04

References

External links
 Stats. at Siena site
 Stats. at Inter site
 Club Stats.
 National Team stats.

1971 births
Living people
People from Potenza
Sportspeople from the Province of Potenza
Association football defenders
Italy under-21 international footballers
Italian footballers
Potenza S.C. players
A.S.D. Giarre Calcio 1946 players
U.S. Cremonese players
A.S. Roma players
Inter Milan players
S.S. Lazio players
A.C.N. Siena 1904 players
S.S.C. Napoli players
Serie A players
Serie B players
UEFA Cup winning players
Competitors at the 1993 Mediterranean Games
Mediterranean Games competitors for Italy
Footballers from Basilicata